For the results of the Colombia national football team, see:
 Colombia national football team results (1938–1979)
 Colombia national football team results (1980–1999)
 Colombia national football team results (2000–2019)
 Colombia national football team results (2020–present)